(1303 –  July 4, 1333) was the last rensho of the Kamakura shogunate, serving from 1330 to 1333.

References

1303 births
1333 deaths
Hōjō clan
People of Kamakura-period Japan